East Beckwith Mountain is a prominent mountain summit in the West Elk Mountains range of the Rocky Mountains of North America.

Geology
East Beckwith Mountain is a laccolith, formed when magma intruded into Mancos Shale approximately 30 million years ago. Subsequently, the softer, overlying sedimentary rock has eroded away, exposing the more resistant igneous rock. East Beckwith Mountain is one of over a dozen laccoliths in the West Elk and adjacent Elk Mountains. Of these laccoliths, East Beckwith Mountain is noted for its distinctive glacial landforms. On the north side of this elongated, east–west oriented mountain, there are five glacially carved cirques with intervening arêtes, and moraines fan out from the mountain's base.

Historical names
East Beckwith Mountain 
Mount Beckwith

See also

West Beckwith Mountain
List of Colorado mountain ranges
West Elk Mountains

References

External links
East Beckwith Mountain CO, listsofjohn.com

West Elk Mountains
Mountains of Gunnison County, Colorado
Gunnison National Forest
Mountains of Colorado
North American 3000 m summits
Laccoliths